Bland Lake (also Blandlake, Stop) is an unincorporated community in San Augustine County, Texas, United States.

Joseph Jefferson Fisher (1910–2000), United States District Court judge, was born in Bland Lake.

Notes

Unincorporated communities in San Augustine County, Texas
Unincorporated communities in Texas